Francisco Arcidio Oviedo Brítez is a Paraguayan politician from the Colorado Party. He served as 27th Vice President of Paraguay from 21 November 2007 to 15 August 2008.

Political career
From 2000 to 2003 Oviedo held a number of ministerial positions in the cabinet of Luis González Macchi. In 2007 Oviedo became a senator in the Paraguayan Senate. Shortly after, he was elected in a special election to succeed Luis Castiglioni as Vice President of the Republic. This was for the remainder of the presidential term, until 15 August 2008.

Presidential aspiration
Nicanor Duarte Frutos offered his resignation as President of Paraguay to the Paraguayan Congress on June 23, 2008.  It was assumed that Oviedo, as vice president, would succeed him. However, President Duarte's resignation was not accepted, and Oviedo therefore did not assume the presidency.

References

Vice presidents of Paraguay
Members of the Senate of Paraguay
Living people
Colorado Party (Paraguay) politicians
Finance Ministers of Paraguay
Interior Ministers of Paraguay
Year of birth missing (living people)